"02 Panic Room" is a single by progressive rock band Riverside. It was released on 15 June 2007 as the first single from the album Rapid Eye Movement, which was released on 8 October 2007.

Background 
This release features four tracks, and was released on the large prog rock label InsideOut Music.

The EP continues with the more raw and heavy feel, as first seen on Second Life Syndrome. The third track, Back to the River, borrows the "Syd's Theme" motif from Pink Floyd's, "Shine On You Crazy Diamond", featured at the 4:32-mark.

It cost 5 zł (ca 1.2 eur). It was certified gold by Polish Society of the Phonographic Industry.

Track listing

Personnel 
 Mariusz Duda – vocals, bass guitar, acoustic guitar
 Piotr Grudziński – guitars
 Michał Łapaj – keyboards
 Piotr Kozieradzki – drums
 Travis Smith – cover art

References 

2007 singles
2007 songs